Bel Air South is a census-designated place (CDP) in Harford County, Maryland, United States. The population was 47,709 at the 2010 census, up from 39,711 in 2000.

Geography
Bel Air South is located southwest of the center of Harford County at  (39.502757, −76.318971). It is bordered to the north by the town of Bel Air (the Harford County seat) and the Bel Air North CDP. It is bordered to the south by Edgewood.

From the Bel Air town limits, the boundary of the Bel Air South CDP follows:
Maryland Route 22 (Churchville Road) east to Schucks Road
Schucks Road south to East Wheel Road
East Wheel Road southwest to Laurel Bush Road
Laurel Bush Road southeast to Abingdon Road
Abingdon Road southeast to Interstate 95
Interstate 95 southwest to Winters Run (I-95 forms the boundary with Edgewood)
Winters Run northwest (upstream) to Baltimore Pike
Baltimore Pike northeast to the Bel Air town limits.

Maryland Route 24 is the main road through the CDP, leading north into Bel Air and south across I-95 at Exit 77 to Edgewood.

The unincorporated community of Emmorton is near the geographic center of the CDP. Fountain Green is an unincorporated community in the northeast part of the CDP.

Demographics

As of the census of 2000, there were 39,711 people, 14,869 households, and 11,017 families residing in the CDP. The racial makeup of the CDP was 91.59% White, 4.11% African American, 0.16% Native American, 2.26% Asian, 0.04% Pacific Islander, 0.65% from other races, and 1.18% from two or more races. Hispanic or Latino of any race were 1.89% of the population.

There were 14,869 households, out of which 40.5% had children under the age of 18 living with them, 62.7% were married couples living together, 8.4% had a female householder with no husband present, and 25.9% were non-families. 21.2% of all households were made up of individuals, and 6.9% had someone living alone who was 65 years of age or older. The average household size was 2.67 and the average family size was 3.13.

In the CDP, the population was spread out, with 28.7% under the age of 18, 6.0% from 18 to 24, 34.8% from 25 to 44, 21.3% from 45 to 64, and 9.2% who were 65 years of age or older. The median age was 35 years. For every 100 females, there were 95.4 males. For every 100 females age 18 and over, there were 91.0 males.

The median income for a household in the CDP was $79,623, and the median income for a family was $92,258. Males had a median income of $49,566 versus $34,263 for females. The per capita income for the CDP was $26,658. About 1.4% of families and 2.6% of the population were below the poverty line, including 1.8% of those under age 18 and 8.5% of those age 65 or over.

References

Census-designated places in Harford County, Maryland
Former census-designated places in Maryland